Luella High School is a public institution within the Henry County School System in Locust Grove, Georgia, United States. It hosts students from ninth through twelfth grades.  Current enrollment is around 1,400 students.  Luella High School shares facilities with Luella Elementary School and Luella Middle School.

Athletics

Baseball
Basketball
Cheerleading
Cross country
Football
Golf
Rifle Team
Soccer
Softball
Tennis
Track
Volleyball
Wrestling

References

External links
Luella High School
Henry County School System

Public high schools in Georgia (U.S. state)
Schools in Henry County, Georgia
2003 establishments in Georgia (U.S. state)
Educational institutions established in 2003